Givaki (also Romanized as Gīvakī and Gīvkī; also known as Gīvahkī) is a village in Solgi Rural District, Khezel District, Nahavand County, Hamadan Province, Iran. At the 2006 census, its population was 552, in 134 families.

References 

Populated places in Nahavand County